The 1905 Kentucky Derby was the 31st running of the Kentucky Derby. The race took place on May 10, 1905. The field was reduced to only three competitors when Dr. Leggo and McClellan scratched.

Full results

Winning Breeder: Runnymede Farm (Ezekiel F. Clay); (KY)

Payout
 The winner received a purse of $4,850.
 Second place received $700.
 Third place received $300.

References

1905
Kentucky Derby
Derby
1905 in American sports
May 1905 sports events